Velton Ray Bunch (born January 22, 1948 in Goldsboro, North Carolina) is a film and television composer. Sometimes credited as Ray Bunch.  Bunch has been nominated for an Emmy three times for his work, and won the fourth time for his score to the Star Trek: Enterprise episode "Similitude".

Career
Bunch has worked on dozens of television series and TV movies, as well as occasional film composition (including additional, uncredited, scoring on the film version of Lost in Space).  He studied and worked under famous television composer Mike Post (Magnum, PI, The Rockford Files, Quantum Leap, Hill Street Blues, much more) in various capacities, including ghostwriting for many popular series Post worked on, and taking over as main composer for Post on various series.

Bunch's credits include the NBC television series Quantum Leap, theme music for NBC's The Pretender (Emmy Nomination, 2000), as well as Flight 93, Three Blind Mice with Brian Dennehy, a Showtime film What Girls Learn, and a biopic based on Senator John McCain's book entitled Faith of My Fathers as well as the Action Pack theme music.

Bunch resides in North Hollywood, California. His last score was for the December 2011 TV movie, Silent Witness.

Awards

References

External links
 (under perpetual re-design)

American male composers
21st-century American composers
Living people
1948 births
21st-century American male musicians